Sami A. Sanjad is a Lebanese-American pediatrician. He described a disorder called Sanjad-Sakati syndrome that was named after his and fellow pediatrician Nadia Awni Sakati's names.

He received his MD in 1965 from the American University of Beirut, where he currently works. He has also worked in the King Faisal Specialist Hospital in Riyadh, Saudi Arabia.

References
 Biography of Sami A. Sanjad, Whonamedit?

Lebanese pediatricians
Living people
Year of birth missing (living people)